This is a list of characters in the American television series Early Edition which ran from September 28, 1996 to May 27, 2000. The characters are listed alphabetically by their last name or by the name which appears in the episode credits.

Main characters

The characters listed in this section are those whose portrayer has appeared in the opening credits. They are listed according to the order in the opening credits.

Recurring characters

Recurring characters that appeared on Early Edition.

References

Early Edition